Hanco is a given name. Notable people with the given name include:

Hanco Germishuys (born 1996), American rugby union player
Hanco Kolk (born 1957), Dutch cartoonist and comics artist
Hanco Olivier (born 1995), South African cricketer
Hanco Venter (born 1993), South African rugby union player